An ultra-short period (USP) planet is a type of exoplanet with orbital period less than one day. At this short distance, tidal interactions lead to relatively rapid orbital and spin evolution. Therefore when there is a USP planet around a mature main-sequence star it is most likely that the planet has a circular orbit and is tidally locked. There are not many USP planets with sizes exceeding 2 Earth radii. About one out of 200 Sun-like stars (G dwarfs) has an ultra-short-period planet. There is a strong dependence of the occurrence rate on the mass of the host star. The occurrence rate falls from (1.1 ± 0.4)% for M dwarfs to (0.15 ± 0.05)% for F dwarfs. Mostly the USP planets seem consistent with an Earth-like composition of 70% rock and 30% iron, but K2-229b has a higher density suggesting a more massive iron core. WASP-47e and 55 Cnc e have a lower density and are compatible with pure rock, or a rocky-iron body surrounded by a layer of water (or other volatiles).

A difference between hot Jupiters and terrestrial USP planets is the proximity of planetary companions. Hot Jupiters are rarely found with other planets within a factor of 2–3 in orbital period or distance. In contrast, terrestrial USP planets
almost always have longer-period planetary companions. The period ratio between adjacent planets tends to be larger if one of them is a USP planet suggesting the USP planet has undergone tidal orbital decay which may still be ongoing. USP planets also tend to have higher mutual inclinations with adjacent planets than for pairs of planets in wider orbits, suggesting that USP planets have experienced inclination excitation in addition to orbital decay.

There are several known giant planets with a period shorter than one day. Their occurrence must be lower by at least an order of magnitude than that of terrestrial USP planets.

It had been proposed that USP planets were the rocky cores of evaporated hot Jupiters, however the metallicity of the host stars of USP planets is lower than that of hot Jupiters' stars so it seems more likely that USP planets are the cores of evaporated gas dwarfs.

References

Types of planet